The Metro Prima MRT station is a mass rapid transit (MRT) station in Kepong in northwestern Kuala Lumpur, Malaysia. It is part of the MRT Putrajaya line.

The station began operations on 16 June 2022 as part of Phase One operations of the Putrajaya Line.

Location 
The station is located along Jalan Kepong, next to its intersection with Jalan Metro Prima. The station primarily serves the Metro Prima commercial centre, hence the name.

There is an AEON Mall 160m southwest of the station.

Station features 

 Elevated station with island platform
 Park & Ride

Bus Services

Feeder buses

Other buses

References

External links
 Metro Prima MRT Station | mrt.com.my
 Klang Valley Mass Rapid Transit website
 MRT Hawk-Eye View

Rapid transit stations in Kuala Lumpur
Sungai Buloh-Serdang-Putrajaya Line
Railway stations opened in 2022